Mac Wilson may refer to:

 Mac Wilson (footballer, born 1914) (1914–2017), Carlton Australian rules footballer 
 Mac Wilson (footballer, born 1922) (1922–1966), Melbourne Australian rules footballer